San Marino RTV is a Sammarinese free-to-air television channel owned and operated by public broadcaster Radiotelevisione della Repubblica di San Marino (SMRTV). It is the company's flagship television channel, and is known for broadcasting news bulletins and self-produced entertainment programming.

It was launched on 28 February 1994 and it was branded as "SMtv San Marino" between 2011 and 2013.

Programming
The channel mostly shows self-produced entertainment programming. It is a member of the European Broadcasting Union (organizer of the Eurovision Song Contest) and the Italian television syndication K2. It also offers a teletext service named San Marino Video.

Eurovision
San Marino RTV is responsible for the Sammarinese participation in the Eurovision Song Contest. The country debuted in 2008 with Miodio and placed last in the first semi-final. After RAI, SMRTV also announced its comeback in the Eurovision Song Contest 2011. It reached the final in 2014 with the song "Maybe" by Valentina Monetta, in 2019 with the song "Say Na Na Na" by Serhat and in 2021 with "Adrenalina" by Senhit (featuring Flo Rida). In 2022, the channel confirmed that the 2023 Eurovision entry would again be selected via Una Voce per San Marino with the final taking place at the Teatro Nuovo in Dogana.

References

External links
 Official site 

Television channels and stations established in 1993
Italian-language television stations